A total solar eclipse will occur at the Moon's descending node of the orbit on Saturday, March 30, 2052. A solar eclipse occurs when the Moon passes between Earth and the Sun, thereby totally or partly obscuring the image of the Sun for a viewer on Earth. A total solar eclipse occurs when the Moon's apparent diameter is larger than the Sun's, blocking all direct sunlight, turning day into darkness. Totality occurs in a narrow path across Earth's surface, with the partial solar eclipse visible over a surrounding region thousands of kilometres wide.
The path of totality will cross central Mexico and the southeastern states of the United States. Almost all of North America and the northern edge of South America will see a partial eclipse. It will be the 2nd total eclipse visible from the Florida Panhandle and southwest Georgia in 6.6 years. It will be the first total solar eclipse visible from Solar Saros 130 in 223 synodic months.

Related eclipses

Solar eclipses 2051–2054

Saros 130

Inex series

Metonic cycle

Notes

References

2052 03 30
2052 in science
2052 03 30
2052 03 30